The Colombian spiny-rat (Proechimys canicollis) is a species of rodent in the family Echimyidae. It is found in Colombia and Venezuela.

Phylogeny
Morphological characters and mitochondrial cytochrome b DNA sequences showed that P. canicollis represents one independent evolutionary lineage within the genus Proechimys, without clear phylogenetic affinity for any of the 6 major groups of species.

References

Proechimys
Mammals of Colombia
Mammals described in 1899
Taxa named by Joel Asaph Allen
Taxonomy articles created by Polbot